Lunca is a commune in Bihor County, Crișana, Romania with a population of 2,887 people. It is composed of six villages: Briheni (Berhény), Hotărel (Határ), Lunca, Sârbești (Szerbesd), Seghiște (Szegyesd) and Șuștiu (Susd).

Demographics
According to the 2011 census, the population of Lunca amounts to 2,887 inhabitants, down from 3,124 inhabitants in the 2002 census. Most of the inhabitants are Romanian (96.95%). For 1.73% of the population, ethnicity is unknown. 94.87% of inhabitants are Orthodox, 2.63% are Pentecostal, and 1.73% are unknown.

References

Lunca
Localities in Crișana